Podolany may refer to the following places in Poland:
Podolany, Poznań, part of the Jeżyce district of Poznań
Podolany, Lower Silesian Voivodeship (south-west Poland)
Podolany, Podlaskie Voivodeship (north-east Poland)
Podolany, Wadowice County in Lesser Poland Voivodeship (south Poland)
Podolany, Wieliczka County in Lesser Poland Voivodeship (south Poland)
Podolany, Świętokrzyskie Voivodeship (south-central Poland)
Podolany, Masovian Voivodeship (east-central Poland)